Jackson Township is an inactive township in Webster County, in the U.S. state of Missouri.

Jackson Township was erected in 1884, taking its name from Andrew Jackson, 7th President of the United States.

References

Townships in Missouri
Townships in Webster County, Missouri